General William Morris Hoge (January 13, 1894 – October 29, 1979) was a United States Army officer who fought in World War I, World War II and the Korean War, with a military career spanning nearly forty years.

Early life and military career

William M. Hoge was born on the campus of Kemper Military School in Boonville, Missouri, where his father William McGuffey Hoge served as principal. In 1905, the family moved to Lexington, Missouri, where his father bought an ownership interest and served as principal and superintendent at Wentworth Military Academy. After graduating from Wentworth in 1911 and taking a postgrad year in New York, he received an appointment to the United States Military Academy (USMA) at West Point, New York. He graduated in June 1916, then was commissioned into the Engineer Branch of the United States Army. His fellow graduates were men such as Horace L. McBride, Stanley Eric Reinhart, Fay B. Prickett, Calvin DeWitt Jr., Dwight Johns, Wilhelm D. Styer and Robert Neyland. Hoge commanded a company of the 7th Engineer Regiment at Fort Leavenworth, Kansas from 1917 to 1918, during World War I.

During World War I, Hoge received the Distinguished Service Cross personally from General John J. Pershing, Commander-in-Chief of the American Expeditionary Force on the Western Front, for heroic action under fire as a battalion commander during the Meuse-Argonne Offensive.

During the interwar years, Hoge graduated from the Massachusetts Institute of Technology and from the United States Army Command and General Staff College.

World War II
Hoge directed one of the great engineering feats of World War II, the construction of the 1,519-mile (2,450 km) ALCAN Highway in nine months. Later, in Europe, he commanded the Provisional Engineer Special Brigade Group attached directly to V Corps (United States) in the assault on Omaha Beach. One of his key men who worked under him from Alaska to England, Colonel Benjamin B. Talley, directed the planning-specifics of the invasion, using maps, air studies, even tourist photos and postcards culled from the British people to learn the topography, and designate which units would assault which sectors of the two United States beaches. Talley went ashore at Omaha in the third wave to direct Engineer operations and immediately begin to receive men by the thousands and supplies by the ton over the beach from the Communications Zone, the supply and service-forces arm of the European Theater of Operations. Hoge later directed Combat Command B of the 9th Armored Division, in its heroic actions in the Ardennes during the Battle of the Bulge, and in its celebrated capture of the Ludendorff Bridge over the Rhine River at Remagen. By war's end, Hoge was the Commanding General of the 4th Armored Division.

Post-World War II
During the Korean War, at the request of General Matthew Ridgway, the Eighth United States Army commander, Hoge commanded the IX Corps in 1951. Hoge achieved his senior command in the army as Commander-in-Chief of United States Army Europe. Hoge was promoted to major general in May 1945, lieutenant general in June 1951, and full general on October 23, 1953.

Hoge retired from active duty in January 1955 to his hometown of Lexington, Missouri, then turned to the private sector as Chairman of the Board of Interlake Steel. Hoge moved to his son's farm in Kansas in October 1975 and he died suddenly on October 29, 1979 at Munson Army Hospital, Fort Leavenworth, Kansas. He was buried at Arlington National Cemetery.

In popular culture
In the 1969 film The Bridge at Remagen, the character of Brigadier General Shinner (played by E. G. Marshall) was based on Hoge.

Awards and decorations
 

Hoge Barracks, the transient housing operation at Fort Leavenworth, is named in his honor.

References

External links

Arlington National Cemetery
Generals of World War II

|-

|-

|-

|-

1894 births
1979 deaths
United States Army Corps of Engineers personnel
Heads of universities and colleges in the United States
Army Black Knights football players
United States Army personnel of World War I
United States Army personnel of the Korean War
Recipients of the Distinguished Service Cross (United States)
Recipients of the Distinguished Service Medal (US Army)
Recipients of the Silver Star
Recipients of the Legion of Merit
Recipients of the Air Medal
Massachusetts Institute of Technology alumni
United States Army Command and General Staff College alumni
Wentworth Military Academy and College alumni
People from Boonville, Missouri
People from Lexington, Missouri
Recipients of the Czechoslovak War Cross
United States Army generals of World War II
United States Army generals
Military personnel from Missouri
20th-century American academics
Burials at Arlington National Cemetery